Pyrotheriidae is the only family in the order Pyrotheria, provided one does not include the Paleocene genus, Carodnia.  These extinct, mastodon-like ungulates include the genera Baguatherium, Carolozittelia, Griphodon, Propyrotherium, and Pyrotherium. Fossils of the family have been found in Argentina, Brazil, Bolivia and Peru.

References

Further reading 

 Access Science
 Mikko's Phylogeny Archive

Meridiungulata
Eocene first appearances
Rupelian extinctions
Fossil taxa described in 1889
Taxa named by Florentino Ameghino
Prehistoric mammal families